The San Pedro Valley of western Cochise County, Arizona, is a , mostly north–south valley, trending northwesterly. The San Pedro River drains from the state of Sonora, Mexico, through Benson, Arizona, and the southeast of the Rincon Mountains.

See also
 San Pedro Valley Railroad
 Tres Alamos, Arizona

References

Landforms of Cochise County, Arizona
 
Landforms of Sonora
Valleys of Arizona
Valleys of Mexico